The Bursuuk or also written as Barsuk or Barsuq or Barsuug (Somali: Barsuug) is a clan belonging to Madahweyne sub clan of the Dir clan family. They largely live in Ethiopia, in the Somali Region, especially around the ancient city of Harar and between the city and Jigjiga.

History
The Bursuuk are considered one of the native Dir tribes of Harar. During the Egyptian occupation of Harar, the Barsuug resisted the Egyptian colonizers and fought many battles against them. During the Egyptian retreat from Harar, they burned many Barsuuk villages. In retaliation, the Bursuuk attacked the retreating Egyptian troops, and looted caravans of the Habr Awal clan. Richard Burton described the Bursuuk as one of "the Somalis of the mountains" who derive themselves from the Dir. 

During 1854 that they were at war with 3 different clans or tribes: the Girhi, the Berteri and the Gallas (who are known today as Oromos).

References

Somali clans in Ethiopia